The Return of Mr. Zone 6 is the eighth studio album by American rapper Gucci Mane. It was released on March 22, 2011, by 1017 Brick Squad Records and Asylum Records. The album features guest appearances from Birdman, Waka Flocka Flame, Master P and Rocko, while the majority of the production was provided by Drumma Boy, except for two tracks that were produced by Zaytoven and Southside.

The album debuted at number 18 on the Billboard 200 and number 2 on the Billboard Top Rap Albums charts, with first week sales of 22,064 copies in the United States.

Promotion 
The music video for "Mouth Full of Golds" featuring Birdman (directed by Mr. Boomtown), was released on February 21, 2011. The track also appeared on Birdman's mixtape, called Bigger Than Life. Released were these two music videos (directed by Mr. Boomtown) for "I Don't Love Her" featuring Rocko and Webbie, and "24 Hours".

Critical reception 

The album received generally positive reviews from music critics. August Brown of the Los Angeles Times said that although Gucci's "notoriously screwball wordplay takes a back seat to a more sedate menace", his "inimitable rasp is where it should be". David Jeffries of AllMusic complimented the album's removal of "radio-friendly numbers and polish", and praised Drumma Boy's production.

In contrast, Jesse Cataldo of Slant gave the album a more negative review, awarding it 2 out of 5 stars and criticizing Gucci's mediocrity.

Track listing

Charts

References

Gucci Mane albums
2011 albums
Albums produced by Drumma Boy
Albums produced by Zaytoven
Warner Records albums
Albums produced by Southside (record producer)